Tim Schulz (born March 1, 1962 in Milwaukee, Wisconsin) is a former U.S. soccer midfielder who played two seasons in the North American Soccer League, two in the Western Soccer Alliance, two in Major Indoor Soccer League and one in the American Professional Soccer League.  He was also a member of the U.S. soccer team at the 1983 Pan American Games.  He coached the U.S. U-20 women's national team at the 2006 FIFA U-20 Women's World Championship.

Player

Schulz was a Parade Magazine High School All American as a soccer player at Air Academy High School in Colorado Springs, Colorado.  In 1980, the San Jose Earthquakes of the North American Soccer League drafted Schulz out of high school.  He broke into the first team during the 1981 season.  In the fall of 1982, he signed with the Denver Avalanche in the Major Indoor Soccer League but was back with the Earthquakes, now known as the Golden Bay Earthquakes in 1983. 
When the NASL collapsed at the end of the 1984 season, he signed with the St. Louis Steamers of the MISL for the 1984–1985 season.  In June 1985, he was back with the Earthquakes, now playing in the Western Soccer Alliance.  In 1986, he moved to the Los Angeles Heat.  He returned to the Steamers for the team's final two years in the MISL, 1986–1988.  In 1990, he played a single season with the expansion Colorado Foxes in the American Professional Soccer League.  In 1992, he signed with he expansion Denver Thunder in the National Professional Soccer League. He retired at the end of the season.

In 1983, he was a part of the U.S. team which finished 0-2-1 at the Pan American Games.

Coach

Schulz has coached at the youth club level since the mid-1980s.  In 1989, he became the director of coaching of the Colorado Rush soccer club.  In 2000, he moved up to become president and CEO of the club.  He was the head coach of the Region IV Olympic Development Program from 2000 to 2004 and was the assistant coach for the U.S. Under-18 Men's National Team from 1998 to 2000.

On May 5, 2005, USSF hired Schulz as the head coach of the United States U-20 women's national soccer team as it prepared for the 2006 FIFA U-20 Women's World Championship.  Schulz took the team to a fourth-place finish in the tournament.

Tim currently serves as a State and USSF National Instructor.  He holds a USSF National “A” license, a NSCAA National Advanced license, and a National Youth license.

Football Administrator 
Tim is the Founder of Rush in 1991 and has been with the club since.  He currently is acting General Manager of Penn FC a USL professional team and Rush Soccer first team.

During his tenure, Rush grew from 1,300 players to 34,000 players representing players from 48 states and 32 countries.

References

External links
NASL/MISL Stats

Living people
1969 births
American Professional Soccer League players
American soccer coaches
American soccer players
Colorado Foxes players
Denver Avalanche players
Denver Thunder players
San Jose Earthquakes (1974–1988) players
Los Angeles Heat players
Major Indoor Soccer League (1978–1992) players
National Professional Soccer League (1984–2001) players
North American Soccer League (1968–1984) players
North American Soccer League (1968–1984) indoor players
Parade High School All-Americans (boys' soccer)
St. Louis Steamers (original MISL) players
Western Soccer Alliance players
Association football midfielders
Footballers at the 1983 Pan American Games
Pan American Games competitors for the United States